El Disco (stylized as #ELDISCO) is the twelfth studio album recorded by Spanish singer-songwriter Alejandro Sanz. It was released on 5 April 2019.

Singles
"No Tengo Nada" was released on 30 November 2018 as the album's lead single. On 8 February 2019, "Back in the City" was released as the album's second single. "Mi Persona Favorita" was released on 28 March 2019 as the album's third single.

Track listing

Accolades

Charts

Weekly charts

Year-end charts

Certifications 

/* Certifications */ https://www.promusicae.es/documents/viewfile/214-top-100-albumes-2020

References

2019 albums
Alejandro Sanz albums
Grammy Award for Best Latin Pop Album
Spanish-language albums
Universal Music Spain albums